Donja Trnava is a village situated in Niš municipality in Serbia. According to the 2002 census, there were 697 inhabitants in Donja Trnava.

References

Populated places in Nišava District